The Scanty (stylized as THE★SCANTY) was a Japanese girls pop-rock band formed in Tokyo in October 2001. They disbanded in October 2003. Futami and Akane formed their own band, Plink?. They performed the two opening themes for the anime series Full Moon o Sagashite and also made cameo appearances in the show.

Members 
 Yoppy (Yoshiko Yamamoto)
The vocalist. Born on October 05, 1980 in Osaka.

 Akane
Bass. From Chiba, born on January 20, 1978.

 Futami 
Guitar. From Tokyo, born on July 5, 1978.

 To-Bu
Drums. From Tochigi, born on July 17, 1973.

Discography

Singles 
"レディースナイト" (TOCT-4324) [10/17/2001], contains:
 レディースナイト (Ladies Night)
 ラブレターヒストリー (Love Letter History)
 レディースナイト (Instrumental)
 ラブレターヒストリー (Instrumental)

"Home Girl" (TOCT-4350) [01/30/2002], contains:
 Home Girl
 Waist
 Home Girl (Instrumental)

"I Heart U" (TOCT-4396) [07/10/2002], contains:
 I Heart U
 FCG Super Remix
 I Heart U　(Instrumental)

"コイバナ" (TOCT-4418) [09/26/2002], contains:
 コイバナ (Koibana)
 Rock'N Roll Princess
 コイバナ (Instrumental)
 Rock'N Roll Princess (Instrumental)

"Loveララバイ" (TOCT-4453) [02/26/2003], contains:
 Love ララバイ (Love Lullaby)
 True Romance
 Love ララバイ (Instrumental)
 True Romance (Instrumental)

"マバタキ (Hippo's Blink Edit)" (YRCN-10018) [08/06/2003], contains:
 マバタキ (Hippo's Blink Edit) (Mabataki (Hippo's Blink Edit)) 	
 One Girl 
 マバタキ (Hippo's Blink Edit) (Instrumental)

Albums 
For Cherry Girls (TOCT-24735) [03/20/2002], contains:
 Home Girl  	
 Promise List 	　
 レディースナイト (Ladies Night)	
 ウサミツ (Usamitsu)　
 Waist (Album Mix)
 I Heart U	　
 ラブレターヒストリー (Album Mix)
 Chocolate Day

Four Lucky Girls (TOCT-24972) [03/26/2003], contains:
 One Girl
 Love ララバイ (Love Lullaby)
 PP
 Lucky 8
 Horoscope
 コイバナ (Koibana)
 Voice March
 マバタキ (Mabataki)

DVD 
The 1st (TOBF-5129) [03/26/2003], contains:
 レディースナイト (Ladies Night)
 Home Girl
 I Heart U
 コイバナ (Koibana)
 Love ララバイ (Love Lullaby)

References

Further reading
 

Japanese rock music groups
All-female bands
Musical groups from Tokyo
Musical groups established in 2001
Musical groups disestablished in 2003